Cadafais is a former civil parish, located in the municipality of Alenquer, in western Portugal. In 2013, the parish merged into the new parish Carregado e Cadafais. It covers 9.29 km² in area, with 1687 inhabitants as of 2001.

References

Former parishes of Alenquer, Portugal